The International Society for Design and Development in Education (ISDDE) was formed in 2005 with the goal of improving educational design in mathematics and science education around the world. Educational design has been an invisible topic relative to educational research, and there has been very little direct attention focused on design principles and design processes in educational design.

Society goals
This international society, focused on mathematics and science education for strategic reasons, has the following main goals:

 broadly improve design and development processes used in educational design
 build and support a community among educational designers and create transformational training opportunities for new educational designers
 increase the impact of educational designers on educational practice throughout the world

Governance
The society is run by an Executive of approximately 12 members. Three officers have particular duties (such as appointing local chairs of the annual conference, organizing the prize process, recruiting and reviewing new Fellows and members, and directing the journal).

 Current executive chair Lynne McClure, University of Cambridge
 Secretary Kristen Tripet, Australian Academy of Science

Chairs History
 Hugh Burkhardt 2005-2009
 Christian Schunn 2010-2014
 Susan McKenney 2015-2016
 Lynne McClure 2017-2018
 Jacquey Barber 2019-2020

Additional details on society governance are described in the society's constitution.

ISDDE Journal
Starting in 2008, the society developed an open access Electronic journal, called the Educational Designer, with roughly annual issues. The editor-in-chief is Kaye Stacey from the University of Melbourne. As an online-only journal, it has the advantage of being able to provide detailed worked examples for other designers.

Annual conference
 2005 Oxford, England; Conference chair Hugh Burkhardt
 2006 Oxford, England; Conference chair Hugh Burkhardt
 2007  Berkeley, California, USA; Conference chair Elizabeth Stage
 2008 Egmond aan Zee, the Netherlands; Conference Chair Peter Boon; ISDDE
 2009 Cairns, Queensland, Australia; Conference Chair Kaye Stacey Conference – Cairns 2009 – ISDDE
 2010 Oxford, England; Conference chair Malcolm Swan Conference – Oxford 2010 – ISDDE
 2011 Boston, Massachusetts, USA; Conference Chairs Frank Davis & Christian Schunn; 
 2012 Utrecht, the Netherlands; Conference Chairs Peter Boon & Frans van Galen; Isdde Utrecht 2012
 2013 Berkeley, California, USA; Conference Chairs Rena Dorph & Jacqueline Barber; ISDDE Berkeley 2013: International Society for Design and Development in Education
 2014 Cambridge, England; Conference chair Lynne McClure; ISDDE 2014
 2015 Boulder, Colorado, USA; Conference chair David Webb; ISDDE2015
 2016 Utrecht, the Netherlands; Conference chairs Maarten Pieters, Wout Ottevanger, & Susan McKenney; ISDDE 2016
 2017 Berkeley, California, USA; Conference chairs Suzy Loper and Mac Cannady; ISDDE 2017
 2018 NUI Galway, Ireland; Conference chairs Tony Hall and Cornelia Connolly; ISDDE 2018
 2019 Pittsburgh, Pennsylvania, USA; Conference chair Christian Schunn; ISDDE Pittsburgh
 2020 Nottingham, England; Conference chair Geoff Wake

Regional conference
 2009 London, England;

Prizes for Excellence in Design for Education, the "Eddies"
Starting in 2008, ISDDE supports a US$10,000 prize for excellence in educational design, known as the "Eddies". The prize alternates across years between rewarding particular designs and rewarding lifetime contributions to educational design.

2008 prize winners
 Malcolm Swan, Shell Centre, University of Nottingham for The Language of Functions and Graphs
 Glenda Lappan and Elizabeth Phillips, Michigan State University,  for Connected Mathematics

2009 prize winner 
 Paul Black of King's College London for a lifetime’s achievement of excellence in educational design and development in science and in technology.

2010 prize winner 
 Michal Yerushalmy of the Research Institute of Alternatives in Education at the University of Haifa for Visual Math, a curriculum developed through a rigorous process to produce innovative materials with great demonstrated impact on students, teachers, and educational designers around the world.

2011 prize winner 
 Jan de Lange of the University of Utrecht for a lifetime’s achievement of excellence in educational design and development in mathematics.

2012 prize winner 
 Jacqueline Barber, Lawrence Hall of Science, University of California, Berkeley, for Seeds of Science/Roots of Reading.

2013 prize winner 
Hugh Burkhardt of the Shell Centre for Mathematical Education for a lifetime’s achievement in recognition of his outstanding contributions to the field, including his leadership of the Shell Centre and his key role in founding this Society.

2014 prize winner 
Christine Cunningham, Boston Museum of Science, for Engineering is Elementary.

2015 prize winner 
Solomon Garfunkel, Consortium for Mathematics and Its Applications, for COMAP

2016 prize winner 
 Uri Wilensky, Northwestern University, for NetLogo

2017 prize winners 
 Kaye Stacey, University of Melbourne
 Zalman Usiskin, University of Chicago

2018 prize winner
 Nicholas Jackiw, SRI International, Inc. / Simon Fraser University

References

External links
 ISDDE website

Mathematics education reform
Science education reform